Teemu Penninkangas (born 24 July 1992) is a Finnish footballer who plays as a left-back for Lahti.

Career

SJK 
Penninkangas won the Veikkausliiga title with SJK in 2015. It was also the first title in club history. Penninkangas made his SJK debut in 2010, back when the club was playing in Kakkonen, the third tier of Finnish football.

FC Lahti 
On 16 January 2019 Penninkangas signed for FC Lahti He left a year later to Sligo Rovers.

Silgo Rovers 
On 10 January 2020, he signed for League of Ireland Premier Division side Sligo Rovers. Penninkangas was released by Sligo Rovers at the end of the 2020 season because the club stopped paying wages.

Return to Lahti 
After a one year spell at Sligo Rovers Penninkangas rejoined FC Lahti and extended his contract until 31 December 2022.

Honours

SJK Seinäjoki 

 Finnish League Cup 2014
 Veikkausliiga 2014-2015
 Finnish Cup 2016

Inter Turku 

 Finnish Cup 2018

References

1992 births
People from Alavus
Living people
Finnish footballers
Association football defenders
FC Jazz players
FC Ilves players
FC Inter Turku players
FC Lahti players
Sligo Rovers F.C. players
SJK Akatemia players
Veikkausliiga players
Ykkönen players
Kakkonen players
League of Ireland players
Finnish expatriate footballers
Expatriate association footballers in Ireland
Sportspeople from South Ostrobothnia